12th SFFCC Awards
December 15, 2013

Best Picture: 
 12 Years a Slave 

The 12th San Francisco Film Critics Circle Awards, honoring the best in film for 2013, were given on 15 December 2013.

Winners

Best Picture:
12 Years a Slave
Best Director:
Alfonso Cuarón – Gravity
Best Original Screenplay:
American Hustle – David O. Russell and Eric Warren Singer
Best Adapted Screenplay:
12 Years a Slave – John Ridley
Best Actor:
Chiwetel Ejiofor – 12 Years a Slave
Best Actress:
Cate Blanchett – Blue Jasmine
Best Supporting Actor:
James Franco – Spring Breakers
Best Supporting Actress:
Jennifer Lawrence – American Hustle
Best Animated Feature:
Frozen
Best Foreign Language Film:
Blue Is the Warmest Colour • France
Best Documentary:
The Act of Killing
Best Cinematography:
Gravity – Emmanuel Lubezki
Best Film Editing:
Gravity – Alfonso Cuarón and Mark Sanger
Best Production Design:
Gravity – Andy Nicholson
Marlon Riggs Award (for courage & vision in the Bay Area film community):
Ryan Coogler – Fruitvale Station
Special Citation (for under-appreciated independent cinema):
Computer Chess

References

External links
 2013 San Francisco Film Critics Circle Awards

San Francisco Film Critics Circle Awards
2013 film awards